Vice Admiral Soonil Vasant Bhokare, AVSM, YSM, NM was a serving Flag Officer in the Indian Navy. He currently serves as the Inspector General Nuclear Safety.

Education
Bhokare is an alumnus of Sainik School Satara. He is a Graduate of National Defence Academy, Khadakvasla. He also attended the Defence Services Staff College, Wellington, Tamil Nadu. He graduated from the Higher Command Course at Army War College, Mhow and also holds a master's degree in Defence and Strategic Studies from Australian Defence College, Canberra.

Navy career
Bhokare has commanded the submarines INS Sindhughosh, INS Sindhudhvaj, INS Sindhushastra, as well as the guided missile frigate INS Beas and the submarine base INS Vajrabahu. He was also the Commodore Commanding Submarines (West) and Chief Staff Officer (Operations) at Eastern Naval Command.

Flag rank
As a Rear Admiral, Bhokare has served as the Flag Officer Submarines (FOSM) and later as Flag Officer Commanding Eastern Fleet (FOCEF).  He was also the Commandant of the Indian Naval Academy.

Awards and decorations
Bhokare has been awarded the AVSM, YSM, NM.

References

 

Living people
Indian Navy admirals
Flag Officers Commanding Eastern Fleet
Submariners
Year of birth missing (living people)
Commandants of the Indian Naval Academy
Flag Officers Submarines (India)
Recipients of the Ati Vishisht Seva Medal
Recipients of the Yudh Seva Medal
Recipients of the Nau Sena Medal
Army War College, Mhow alumni